Martin Grabmann (5 January 1875 – 9 January 1949) was a German Roman Catholic priest, medievalist and historian of theology and philosophy. He was a pioneer of the history of medieval philosophy and has been called "the greatest Catholic scholar of his time."

Early life
Grabmann was born in Winterzhofen, Bavaria, Germany, on 5 January 1875 to a deeply religious Bavarian parents, Joseph Grabmann (1848-1915), a farmer, and Walburga Bauer (1850-1886). He had two brothers.

He attended the gymnasium in Eichstätt. At the College of Philosophy and Theology the Bischoefliches Lyzeum, a centre of scholastic renewal, Grabmann was influenced by his teacher Franz von Paula Morgott (1829-1900) to study the work of Thomas Aquinas.

Religious life

In August 1895, Grabmann entered the Dominican novitate at what is now Olomouc in the Czech Republic, but he left six months later to pursue the secular priesthood. He was ordained on March 20, 1898. He became a tertiary of the Dominican Order in 1921. After ordination, he was sent by his bishop to study in Rome.

Research
Grabmann was an alumnus of the Collegium Divi Thomæ de Urbe, the future Pontifical University of St. Thomas Aquinas Angelicum in Rome (Italy). At the Angelicum, he obtained a baccalaureate, a licentiate and a doctorate in philosophy by 1901 and a doctorate in theology in 1902. Grabmann studied palaeography at the Vatican Library and was encouraged by two of the most distinguished palaeographers of the time, Henry Denifle, the prefect of the Vatican library, and Cardinal Franz Ehrle.

Career
Grabmann was made a professor of theology and philosophy at the Catholic University of Eichstätt in 1906.

The first of his great works, Die Geschichte der scholastischen Methode, in two volumes, 1909 and 1911 made extensive use of unpublished medieval texts. After the publication of his two-volume work, he was awarded an honorary doctorates by the Institut supérieur de philosophie (Higher Institute of Philosophy) of Louvain in 1913.

Grabmann was called to the University of Vienna in 1913 to fill the chair of Christian philosophy at the Faculty of Theology. There, he completed pioneering research on the history of Aristotelianism in the 13th century which was published in 1916 as Forschungen über die lateinischen Aristoteles-Übersetzungen des XIII. Jahrhunderts.

Grabmann returned to Bavaria in 1918 to serve as professor of dogmatic theology at the University of Munich. His research and publications flourished, including 212 books, articles, and reviews. Between 1921 and 1938, his research took him to most of the major Italian libraries specializing in medieval studies, as well as to libraries in Spain, France, Belgium, and Sweden.

Influence in philosophy
Grabmann's thought was instrumental in the modern understanding of scholasticism and the pivotal role of Aquinas. He was the first scholar to work out the outlines of the ongoing development of thought in scholasticism. He was first to see that Aquinas had a response and development of thought rather than a single, coherently emerged and organic whole.

According to Battista Mondin, Grabmann interprets Aquinas' metaphysics as an advanced version of Aristotle's based on the notion of common being (ens commune) and his rational theology as employing an original concept of being to describe the Divine attributes based on the notion of subsistent being itself (esse ipsum subsistens).

Grabmann was foundational in fostering the variety of contemporary interpretations of both scholasticism and Aquinas.

Death
He died in Eichstätt.

Works
Grabmann's 2-volume masterpiece The History of Scholastic Method (Die Geschichte der scolastischen Methode) (1909-1911) is the first scholarly work to outline the ongoing development of scholasticism.

His “Thomas Aquinas: His Personality and Thought” (Thomas von Aquin, eine einführung in seine persönlichkeit und gedankenwelt) (1912) emphasizes Aquinas' development of thought more than a single, coherent system.

Although Grabmann's works in German are numerous, only Thomas Aquinas (1928) is available in English.

References

Sources
Cross, F.L., Livingstone, E. A. (eds.), "Martin Grabmann," in: The Oxford Dictionary of the Christian Church (New York: Oxford University Press, 1974), p. 585.
Rosemann, Philipp W., "Martin Grabmann (1875–1949)," in Medieval Scholarship: Biographical Studies on the Formation of a Discipline, ed. Helen Damico, vol. 3: Philosophy and the Arts,'' Garland Reference Library of the Humanities 2110 (New York: Garland Publishing, 2000), pp. 55–74.

1875 births
1949 deaths
20th-century German historians
20th-century German Catholic theologians
Members of the Prussian Academy of Sciences
People from the Kingdom of Bavaria
Academic staff of the University of Vienna
Academic staff of the Ludwig Maximilian University of Munich
Pontifical University of Saint Thomas Aquinas alumni
People from Neumarkt (district)
Dominican tertiaries
Lay Dominicans
German male non-fiction writers
Corresponding Fellows of the Medieval Academy of America
Members of the German Academy of Sciences at Berlin